Gwardia Wrocław, officially Volleyball Wrocław stylised as #VolleyWrocław for sponsorship reasons, is a Polish women's volleyball club based in Wrocław and playing in the Polish Volleyball League.

Previous names

Due to sponsorship, the club have competed under the following names:
 KS Gwardia Wrocław (1945–1990s)
 ZEC ESV Gwardia Wrocław (1990s–2004)
 ZEC SV Gwardia Wrocław (2004–2006)
 Dialog Gwardia Wrocław (2006–2007)
 Impel Gwardia Wrocław (2007–2012)
 Impel Wrocław (2012–2018)
 #VolleyWrocław (2018–present)

History
The club was established in July 1945 as the police sports club and was named . It offered many different sports (at its peak in the 1980s it had 19 sports departments) and volleyball has always been one of its most important departments. It gained importance in the 1990s when women's volleyball started to become professional in Poland. That commercialization brought sponsors (the club has been renamed few times through the years) and investors. The club first played in the highest Polish Women's Volleyball League in 1999 and has also participated in European competitions (Top Teams Cup and Challenge Cup).

2010–2011 season
Since the new season there was more money in the budget. Impel Gwardia Wroclaw could afford good athletes. The top athletes in the club: Katarzyna Mroczkowska, Bogumiła Barańska, Joanna Wołosz, Monika Czypiruk, Zuzanna Efimienko, Dominika Sobolska, Ola Krzos have been preserved. The team left Olga Owczynnikowa, Aleksandra Szafraniec, Marta Czerwińska. Another player- Agnieszka Jagiełło ended his career volleyball. There have been interesting transfers. The team joined Anna Witczak of Muszynianka Muszyna, Ewa Matyjaszek and Maja Tokarska of PTPS Piła, the sister of Dominika Sobolska - Marta and returning after maternity leave Katarzyna Jaszewska. Additionally there was a change on the coach of physician coach-  Christian Verona, who worked last season with the club Monte Schiavo Banca Marche Jesi. Ultimately, the team finished the game on the 5th place.

2011–2012 season

In 2011 the owner of the Impel Gwardia Wrocław became Impel S.A. The investor responsible for the team supervision is Impel Volleyball S.A.- the company  belonging to the Impel  Group. The core team from last season: Katarzyna Mroczkowska, Bogumiła Pyziołek or Anna Witczak hasn't been changed. The contract with the club has also renewed Katarzyna Jaszewska – Impel's Gwardia best volleyball player in the 2010/2011 season. Jaszewska along with Susan Efimienko represented our country at the last European Championship volleyball team taking the 5th place. Joanna Wołosz and Maja Tokarska left the team to join BKS Bielsko-Biała and Atom Trefl Sopot, respectively. In return the team strengthened: Arielle Wilson (from the USA - academic game), Milena Rosner, member of the Poland national team, which won the 2005 Women's European Volleyball Championship, Marta Haładyn (from MKS Dąbrowa Górnicza) and Dorota Medyńska (SMS Sosnowiec / TOP Bolesławiec). The injury healed Aleksandra Folta, which together with Dorota Medyńska is the youngest part of the Impel Gwardia. Women's team played in Women PlusLiga so far 15 matches, winning five of them. Team has the 17 points and followed by the 7th position. Team is doing very well in the Challenge Cup, advancing to 1 / 8 of the tournament. The team finished the game on the 5th place.

Honours
Polish Championship
Runners-up (1): 2013–14
'Polish Cup:
Runners-up (3): 1960–61, 2002–03, 2003–04

TeamSeason 2016–2017, as of March 2017.''

References

External links

 Official website 

Volleyball clubs established in 1945
1945 establishments in Poland
Women's volleyball teams in Poland
Sport in Wrocław